The 50th Assembly District of Wisconsin is one of 99 districts in the Wisconsin State Assembly. Located in central Wisconsin, the district comprises all of Juneau County, and parts of north and central Sauk County, northeast Richland County, eastern Vernon County.  It includes the cities of Elroy, Hillsboro, Mauston, New Lisbon, Reedsburg, and Richland Center, as well as the villages of Camp Douglas, Cazenovia, La Valle, Lyndon Station, Necedah, North Freedom, Rock Springs, and Wonewoc.  The district also contains landmarks such as the Necedah National Wildlife Refuge, Buckhorn State Park, the Dell Creek State Wildlife Area, the eastern half of Mill Bluff State Park, and the Volk Field Air National Guard Base. The district is represented by Republican Tony Kurtz, since January 2019.

The 50th Assembly district is located within Wisconsin's 17th Senate district, along with the 49th and 51st Assembly districts.

List of past representatives

References 

Wisconsin State Assembly districts
Juneau County, Wisconsin
Monroe County, Wisconsin
Richland County, Wisconsin
Sauk County, Wisconsin
Vernon County, Wisconsin